Marek Václav (born 26 July 1996) is a Slovak footballer who plays as a defender for MFK Skalica.

Club career
Václav made his professional Fortuna Liga debut for FC Spartak Trnava against MFK Ružomberok on 11 August 2020.

References

External links
 FC Spartak Trnava official club profile 
 Futbalnet profile 
 
 

1996 births
Living people
Slovak footballers
Association football defenders
FK Slovan Duslo Šaľa players
AFC Nové Mesto nad Váhom players
FK Dubnica players
FC Spartak Trnava players
FC Košice (2018) players
MFK Skalica players
Slovak Super Liga players